The 2004 United States House of Representatives election in Vermont was held on Tuesday, November 2, 2004, to elect the U.S. representative from the state's at-large congressional district. The election coincided with the elections of other federal and state offices, including a quadrennial presidential election and an election to the U.S. Senate.

As of 2020, this is the last time someone who was not a member of the Democratic or Republican party was elected to the House of Representatives.

Candidates

Independent
Bernie Sanders, incumbent U.S. Representative

Republican
Gregory "Greg" Tarl Parke, former United States Air Force lieutenant colonel

Democratic
Larry Drown

Liberty Union
Jane Newton

General election

Controversy
On Friday, October 29, 2004, the Parke campaign aired a radio ad which portrayed Sanders as being on friendly terms with pornographers, pedophiles, illegal immigrations and terrorists. The ad was pulled the same day that it first aired.  Parke was criticized for his actions by both the state chairman of the Vermont Republican Party, James Barnett and Vermont Lieutenant Governor Brian Dubie, as well as by other Vermont Republicans.

Parke had earlier blamed Sanders for the September 11, 2001, World Trade Center attacks based on Sanders prior vote to cut the intelligence budget.

Results

References

2004
United States House of Representatives
Vermont
Bernie Sanders